Alpine skiing at the 1996 Winter Asian Games took place in Harbin, China from 5 to 8 February 1996 with four events contested — two each for men and women.

Medalists

Men

Women

Medal table

References
 
 FIS Results

 
1996 Asian Winter Games events
1996
1996 in alpine skiing